Henry V. Schwalbach (April 24, 1878 – February 25, 1958) was an American businessman and politician.

Born in South Germantown, Wisconsin, Schwalbach was in the general merchandise business in South Germantown. In 1909 and 1911, Schwalbach served in the Wisconsin State Assembly and was a Democrat. In 1933, President Franklin Roosevelt appointed Schwalbach customs collector for the District of Wisconsin; Schwalbach served until 1951.

He died in Milwaukee on February 25, 1958.

References

1878 births
1958 deaths
People from Germantown, Wisconsin
Businesspeople from Wisconsin
Democratic Party members of the Wisconsin State Assembly